University of Florida Center for African Studies (CAS) is a center within of the College of Liberal Arts and Sciences (CLAS) at the University of Florida (UF). The Center provides teaching and research into issues of African languages, humanities, social sciences, agriculture, business, engineering, education, fine arts, environmental studies, conservation, journalism, and law.

The Center for African Studies currently offers undergraduate and postgraduate study programs in numerous Africa-related fields.

Mission
The Center for African Studies is in the College of Liberal Arts & Sciences at the University of Florida. As a National Resource Center for African Studies, their mission is to promote excellence in teaching and research on Africa in all the disciplines at the UF. The Center also disseminates knowledge about Africa to the wider community through an integrated outreach program to schools, colleges, community groups, and businesses. Central to this mission is sustaining contacts and expanding interactive linkages with individuals and institutions on the African continent. In addition to undergraduate education, the Center promotes and supports graduate studies as essential for the development of a continuing community of Africanist scholars.

The Center has over 100 affiliated teaching and research faculty in a wide variety of fields, including: languages, the humanities, the social sciences, agriculture, business, engineering, education, fine arts, environmental studies and conservation, journalism, and law. A number of faculty members with appointments wholly or partially within the Center have facilitated the development of a core curriculum in African Studies in support of the undergraduate minor and graduate certificate programs.

A full-time Outreach Director oversees an active program that provides ongoing training opportunities for K-12 teachers and educators from postsecondary institutions as well as outreach for business, media, and community groups.

CAS is funded in part by the U.S. Department of Education Title VI National Resource Center program which supports research, teaching, outreach, and development of international linkages. It is the only National Resource Center for Africa located in the southeastern US, and the only one in a sub-tropical zone.

The Center thus plays a pivotal role in addressing issues critical for understanding Africa in the global context. At a time when the University of Florida is expanding its international dimension, a major component of the Center for African Studies’ mission is to work with the rest of the University in promoting Africa-related programs on the campus and beyond.

Program in African Languages 
The Program in African Languages is one of the Center for African Studies’ central components in its mission to work with the rest of the University in promoting Africa-related studies on the campus and beyond. In addition to undergraduate education, the Center for African Studies promotes and supports graduate studies as an essential part for the development of a continuing community of Africanist scholars. In this regard, the CAS, in close collaboration with the Department of Languages, Literatures, & Cultures, has committed itself to developing and maintaining a viable, comprehensive and dynamic program in African languages.

Currently, the Center for African Studies offers language training in Akan, Amharic, Arabic, Swahili, Wolof, Xhosa, and Yoruba, although other languages have been offered in the past. The University of Florida is only the second university nationwide to offer an African languages major.

African Studies Library Collection 
The African Studies Collection at the University of Florida Libraries is recognized as a unique resource within the University of Florida's George A. Smathers libraries, ranking among the best such collections in the U.S. Its holdings include disciplinary topics from the natural sciences and applied fields such as agriculture and public health, to the social sciences, humanities, and professions. Reflecting the great breadth and depth of these academic and professional programs, the African Studies Collection facilitates interdisciplinary and applied approaches to the study of the continent, its flora and fauna, peoples and cultures, natural resources and wildlife for which UF's African Studies programs are best known. The African Studies Collection has a collaborative partnership with the UF Center for African Studies, which contributes generous funding for library materials and services through its U.S. Department of Education Title VI grant as a National Resource Center.

Some of the African Studies collections are available through the UF Digital Collections, accessible online. Sub-collections within the African Studies Library Digital Collection include The Arts of Africa = Les Arts d'Afrique, Photographs of Africa Collection, Wildlife Conservation, Jean Marie Derscheid, Onitsha Market Literature, George Fortune Collection, and Martin Rikli Photographs Collection.

Notable print holdings (from which many of the digital collections derive) include the George Fortune collection of Southern Bantu linguistics (especially Shona), the Donald Abraham collection of Lusophone culture and history (concentrating on Angola and Mozambique), Gwendolen M. Carter's materials relating to the South African liberation struggle,  Bob Campbell's photographs of Dian Fossey and the Karisoke Research Center, and Martin Rikli's photographic albums of Ethiopia during the Italian invasion and occupation of 1935-1936. Finding aids for these and related manuscript collections, most of which are yet to be digitized, are available online.

For maps of Africa, see also the African Map Collection which offers maps dating from the 16th through the 21st centuries, including examples of work from the most important cartographers and representing some of the most important maps from the Age of Exploration to the present day.

African Studies Quarterly 
The Center for African Studies founded the African Studies Quarterly (ASQ) to promote research on Africa beyond that undertaken by University of Florida faculty and graduate students. It is an interdisciplinary, fully refereed, online open access journal dedicated to publishing the finest scholarship relating to the African continent.

ASQ invites the submission of original manuscripts on a full range of topics related to Africa in all areas. To qualify for consideration, submissions must meet the scholarships standards within the appropriate discipline and be of interest to an interdisciplinary readership. As an electronic journal, ASQ welcomes submissions that are of a time-sensitive nature.

See also
University of Florida
College of Liberal Arts and Sciences at UF

References

External links
Official website
List of current Faculty
Graduate Fellowships offered by CAS
Annual Research Reports
African Studies Library Collection
International Center at UF

University of Florida
African studies
Ethnic studies organizations
1964 establishments in Florida